Asghar Imanian was an Iranian fighter pilot. He served as the commander of the Air Force from late March to early August 1979.

References

Commanders of Islamic Republic of Iran Air Force
1929 births
2015 deaths
Imperial Iranian Army brigadier generals
Islamic Republic of Iran Army brigadier generals